Clare Hanrahan is a former camogie player, winner of the Cuchulainn award in 1965. Having previously starred in attack for Kilkenny in their Leinster junior victories of 1959 and 1960 she burst on to the scene with four goals for Leinster in the 1960 Gael Linn Cup final and was Leinster's most effective forward over the next five years.

References

Living people
Kilkenny camogie players
Year of birth missing (living people)